Angie Julieth Castañeda Vanegas (born 4 February 1998) is a Colombian footballer who plays as a forward for Spanish Primera Federación club CP Cacereño and the Colombia women's national team.

International career
Castañeda represented Colombia at the 2014 FIFA U-17 Women's World Cup. She made her senior debut on 19 July 2018 in a 0–1 friendly loss to Costa Rica.

References

External links
Angie Castañeda at BDFútbol

1998 births
Living people
Footballers from Bogotá
Colombian women's footballers
Women's association football forwards
Segunda Federación (women) players
Colombia women's international footballers
Colombian expatriate women's footballers
Colombian expatriate sportspeople in Spain
Expatriate women's footballers in Spain
Primera Federación (women) players
CP Cacereño (women) players